Thamesford (Harydale Farms) Aerodrome  is an aerodrome located  north of Thamesford, Ontario in Canada.

References

Registered aerodromes in Ontario